Aa Naluguru is a 2004 Indian Telugu-language drama film directed by Chandra Siddhartha. The film stars Rajendra Prasad and Aamani with music composed by R. P. Patnaik. It is produced by Sarita Patra, and P. Prem Kumar. The film won three Nandi Awards and also screened at the AISFM Film Festival. It marked the return of Aamani to films after a gap of seven years. The film was later remade in Kannada in 2006 as Sirivantha.

Plot
The film starts with two messengers of God coming to take the life of Raghuram. He is a kind-hearted idealistic individual who spends half of his income on charity work. He works as the editor of a newspaper. When his managing director asks him to publish tabloid photos to increase circulation, he is ready to resign and sell Papads instead of losing his values. Later he realizes his mistake and reappoints Raghuram as the editor and promises him not to involve in his duty.

His wife Bharati, two sons Shekar and Chinna and a daughter Revathi are quite against his helping attitude. His children compel him to get money for their career (bribe for a job), education (donation fee for engineering seat) and settling in the United States which he feels is completely wrong. He is forced to set aside his morality and take a loan from his neighbor, Kotayya. Unable to bear the defeat of his ideology and moral issues, he commits suicide by consuming poison the same day he gives money to his children. The rest of the film is about how his children and wife realize just how important he was as they prepare his funeral. At last, everyone realizes that after death only love and affection will come with us so love the people and society.

Cast

Rajendra Prasad as Raghu Ramayya
Aamani as Bharathi
Kota Srinivasa Rao as Kotayya
Subhalekha Sudhakar as Subramanyam
Raja as Shekar, Raghu Ramayya's elder son
Chalapathi Rao as Messenger of god
Raghu Babu as Messenger of god
Suthi Velu as Mallayya, Office Peon
Prem Kumar Patra as G. Venkat Rao, Raghu Ramyya's boss
Giridhar as Suri, Kotaiah's son
Pingpong Surya as Chinna, Raghu Ramayya's younger son
Revathi as Indira, Raghu Ramayya's daughter
Junior Relangi as astrologer
Jenny
Annapurna as Raghu Ramayya's mother (cameo appearance)
Rajitha as Subramanyam's wife
Apoorva as Kotayya's wife

Music

Music was composed by R. P. Patnaik. Lyrics were written by Chaitanya Prasad. Music released on Aditya Music Company.

Awards
Nandi Awards - 2004
 Best Feature Film - Gold - Sarita Patra
 Best Actor - Rajendra Prasad
 Best Character Actor  - Kota Srinivasa Rao

References

External links
 

2004 films
2000s Telugu-language films
Indian drama films
Telugu films remade in other languages
Films about women in India
Social realism in film
Films shot in Hyderabad, India
Indian feminist films
Films about brothers
Films about old age
Films based on adaptations
Films about dysfunctional families
Midlife crisis films
Indian family films
2004 drama films
2000s feminist films